Events in the year 1397 in Norway.

Incumbents
Monarch: Eric III (along with Margaret)

Events
17 June - The Kalmar Union is formed.

Arts and literature

Births

Deaths

References

Norway